Death Comes in 26 Carefully Selected Pieces is the tenth album by the Finnish black metal band Impaled Nazarene. It was recorded live at the Tavastia Club in Helsinki on December 19, 2004 and released in 2005.

Track listing
All Lyrics By Mika Luttinen. Music As Noted. Copyright Les Editions Hurlantes.
 "Intro" (M. Makinen) 2:57
 "The Horny and the Horned" (Kimmo Luttinen) 3:30
 "Armageddon Death Squad" (Mikael Arnkil) 2:54
 "Goat Perversion" (K. Luttinen) 1:17
 "1999:Karmageddon Warriors" (Taneli Jarva) 2:40
 "Motörpenis" (Jarva) 2:05
 "Kohta ei naura enää Jeesuskaan" (M. Luttinen) 2:09
 "The Endless War" (Arnkil) 3:57
 "Sadhu Satana" (K. Luttinen) 2:59
 "Ghettoblaster" (K. Luttinen) 2:10
 "Coraxo" (K. Luttinen) 0:15
 "Soul Rape" (K. Luttinen) 1:52
 "Sadistic 666/Under a Golden Shower" (K. Luttinen) 4:24
 "Zero Tolerance" (Alexi Laiho) 1:38
 "The Maggot Crusher" (Reima Kellokoski) 3:27
 "Let's Fucking Die" (Laiho, K. Luttinen) 2:26
 "Tribulation Hell" (Arnkil) 3:11
 "We're Satan's Generation" (M. Luttinen) 2:11
 "Cogito Ergo Sum" (Laiho) 2:13
 "Goat Seeds of Doom" (Arnkil) 3:20
 "Condemned to Hell" (K. Luttinen) 3:53
 "Intro SFP" (K. Luttinen) 0:53
 "Sadogoat" (K. Luttinen) 2:49
 "Vitutuksen Multihuipennus" (K. Luttinen) 2:01
 "The Lost Art of Goat Sacrificing" (Kellokoski) 3:34
 "Total War-Winter War" (K. Luttinen) 3:10

Personnel
Mika Luttinen: Vocals
Tuomio: Lead Guitar
Onraj 9MM: Rhythm Guitar
Arc V 666: Bass
Repe Misanthrope: Drums

Production
Produced By Impaled Nazarene
Recorded, Engineered & Mixed By Tapio Pennanen
Digital Editing & Mastering By Mika Jussila

References

External links
Impaled Nazarene at Metal From Finland
"Death Comes In..." at discogs

Sources
CD- Death Comes in 26 Carefully Selected Pieces

Impaled Nazarene albums
2005 live albums